Capital punishment in Kuwait is legal. The death penalty is enforced rarely, however, with the last execution occurring in 2022. Hanging is the method of choice for civilian executions. However, shooting is a legal form of execution in certain circumstances.

Capital offences
The following crimes may be punished with death under Kuwaiti civilian law: premeditated murder, terrorism giving  in death (mandatory), perjury resulting in an innocent execution, destroying buildings belonging to the government or those known to be inhabited, rape, kidnapping, drug trafficking, and espionage.

Under the Kuwaiti Military Code, the following military offences may be punished with death: revealing classified information, cowardice, desertion, collaborationism, rebellion, insubordination, and interfering with action in the line of defence. As well as this, enemy soldiers can be executed if they commit war crimes or spy on the Kuwaiti military or government.

Excused persons
The following offenders shall not be subject to capital punishment if found guilty of a capital offence:

Pregnant women
Women with small children
Minors (under 18 years of age) at the time the crime was committed

These offenders will have their sentences reduced to life imprisonment. Mentally ill persons are excluded from this list because they cannot be held responsible for criminal charges under Kuwaiti law in any instance.

Legal proceedings

Judicial review and appeal
After a person is sentenced to death in a Kuwaiti court, their case is automatically reviewed by the appellate court, of whom take into consideration the crime, evidence reviewed by the court, the previous convictions of defendant and other factors. If the court of appeal rejects this appeal, then they go to the court of cassation (Supreme Court) of which is the highest governing legal body in the country. Once it has been reviewed, the Emir of Kuwait must approve of the sentence. Once this occurs, an execution order is issued by the Chief Justice, specifying the date, time, place and method (usually hanging) of the execution, of which is given to the prosecutor.

Execution
Since 2002, executions have occurred at Nayef Palace, but not in public as was the case before. Prisoners are held in solitary confinement until the day of their execution, where they are transported to the execution ground. At about 08:00, prisoners are hooded with a black hood, unlike the British style white hood and their arms and legs are pinioned (strapped). New steel gallows were fitted in the early 2000s and have been used for executions since then. A noose is put around their neck with the knot below the ear and the trapdoor is opened. They are given measured drops in order to break their necks, a development of the method practised in the United Kingdom. The press and public are allowed to view the bodies after the execution. The press have been reported to publish images of the dead bodies in newspapers to serve as a deterrent against crime.

References

Human Rights Watch Kuwait: first executions in four years 
Capital punishment in Kuwait
Capital punishment UK - Capital punishment in Kuwait 1964 to date
 

Kuwait
Law of Kuwait
Crime in Kuwait
Human rights abuses in Kuwait